The Landport is a gate into the territory of Gibraltar.  It was originally the only entrance to the fortification from the land and so was heavily fortified and guarded.

Description

After the territory was first captured from the Spanish in 1704, the British defended the Landport with twenty guns. There were also obstacles in it such as chevaux de frise and metal hoops. There was also a moat covering the northern approach — the Landport Ditch. The ditch's defences included a palisade and a gunpowder mine which could be exploded beneath an assault. To cross these defences, there was a drawbridge which was pulled up at night. Tobacco smugglers would exit the gate at this time and lurk outside, waiting for an opportunity to cross the neutral ground into Spain during the night.

See also
 Grand Casemates Gates
 King James's and Landport Gates — similar gates in the port of Portsmouth
 Southport Gates

References

City gates in Gibraltar
Tunnels in Gibraltar